Roberto Biffi (born 21 August 1965) is an Italian professional football coach and former coach. He played as a centre-back.

Career

Player
A tough defender formed in the AC Milan youth system, Biffi made his professional debut with the rossoneri during their 1982-1983 Serie B season, scoring a total of four first team caps. 

He then played for several Serie B and C teams before joining Palermo in 1988. He served a total of eleven seasons, all between Serie B and Serie C1, with the rosanero, often captaining his side. He left Palermo in 1999 at the age of 34, after 319 appearances with the Sicilian side which made him the player with the highest number of appearances with the rosanero jersey. He retired in 2005 after two seasons with Sanremese, without having ever played a single Serie A match.

Coach
In the summer of 2007, Roberto Biffi started a coaching career, being appointed at the helm of Serie D team Sanremese. He was however sacked only a few months later, on November, following a string of poor results. 

He then started the 2008–09 season serving as head coach of Savona, another Ligurian Serie D team, but was fired on September 2008 after only six games, in which he managed to achieve only four points. 

He also briefly worked as an assistant coach for Bulgarian Botev Plovdiv in 2009.

Since 10 February 2012 to the end of the season he was the last coach of the club of Imperia Calcio, in Eccellenza Liguria.

He successively served as head coach of several amateur clubs in Liguria such as Loanesi (Promozione Liguria), Sestrese, Ospedaletti and Alassio (Eccellenza).

References

Sources
Career profile

1965 births
Living people
Italian footballers
Italian football managers
Serie B players
A.C. Milan players
A.C. Prato players
Palermo F.C. players
Mantova 1911 players
Calcio Foggia 1920 players
Modena F.C. players
Parma Calcio 1913 players
S.S. Fidelis Andria 1928 players
S.S.D. Sanremese Calcio players
S.S.D. Sanremese Calcio managers
Association football defenders
Footballers from Milan
U.S. Imperia 1923 managers